Amer Mohammad Rashid al-Ubaidi (born 1939 in Baghdad) served as Oil Minister under Saddam Hussein.

Life
A former general in Iraq's army, he also advised Hussein on other matters, and was sometimes referred to as "Missile Man" in reference to his expertise with weapons delivery systems. He is the husband of Dr. Rihab Taha (a.k.a. "Dr. Germ"), a microbiologist active in research into the production of bioweapons. Iraqi government news sources indicated that he retired from his positions in 2002, at the age of 65.

Rashid was the six of spades in the most-wanted Iraqi playing cards issued by the United States during the 2003 invasion of Iraq. After the invasion commenced, he issued a public statement calling for other Arab nations to decrease oil production, in order "to make the cost of war high for the Americans." American troops raided his Baghdad home on April 14, 2003, in an effort to take him and his wife into custody, but both evaded capture. He surrendered to coalition forces on April 28, 2003, and his wife surrendered on May 10, 2003.

Rashid was quietly released in April 2012.

References

Living people
1939 births
Oil ministers of Iraq
Iraqi generals
Arab Socialist Ba'ath Party – Iraq Region politicians
Prisoners and detainees of the United States military
People from Baghdad
Most-wanted Iraqi playing cards
Iraq War prisoners of war
Iraqi prisoners of war